Anil Johnson is an Indian film composer and record producer who works in Malayalam cinema.  Besides feature films, he has composed for commercials, documentaries, corporate films, short films and music videos. Prior to becoming a mainstream score composer, he worked as an arranger for several other composers and bands in the Indian music industry. He has also directed television commercials in the mid-2000s.

Biography
Anil Johnson was born on 24 March 1973 in Fort Cochin, to P.J Joseph and Thankamma Joseph. He has a younger brother named Benil George. Anil Johnson graduated in Commerce from Mahatma Gandhi University and Master Diploma from Tata Unysis. Married to Anjana Joy and has 2 children Vivian & Dia. Obtained lessons in Carnatic Classical music at the age of 4 and piano at the age of 13. He started his career as a singer/ keyboard player and later into composing music for Plays, Music Albums, jingles, Documentaries, Corporate Films, Short Films and Feature Films.

Discography

Awards and nominations

References

Living people
Musicians from Kochi
21st-century classical composers
Malayalam film score composers
Filmfare Awards South winners
Film musicians from Kerala
1973 births